The Explorer Belt is an award available to Rover Scouts in Irish Scouting. Over the last 43 years, over 2,000 Venture and Rover Scouts have gone on Explorer Belt Expeditions. Ireland's Explorer Belt is recognised as being one of the most challenging yet ultimately rewarding activities in Scouting. The Explorer Belt was traditionally linked to the Venture Scout Section but since the introduction of ONE Programme, and the standardisation of age ranges the Explorer Belt is now a Rover Scout event and participants must be over the age of 18. A similar award is available in other Scout associations around the world.

Location
Over the last 43 years locations have been widely varied.
The Locations for belts run by CBSI/CSI/SI-CSI are:
 1980 - Normandy, France
 1981 - No event
 1982 - Vermont, New Hampshire, and New York, United States
 1983 - Wales
 1984 - Sweden (first female team and first team to get a second Belt)
 1985 - No event
 1986 - Scotland
 1987 - Bavaria (Cancelled)
 1988 - Italy and Wales (The Welsh event was a joint CBSI/SAI event)
 1989 - Le Conquet, France
 1990 - Denmark
 1991 - Scotland
 1992 - England
 1993 - Wales
 1994 - Scotland
 1995 - Hungary
 1996 - Wales
 1997 - Slovenia
 1998 - Belgium
 1999 - Northern France
 2000 - Brno, Czech Republic
 2001 - Italy
 2002 - Lithuania
 2003 - Spain (intended to be Canada, changed due to SARS outbreak, nicknamed the "Spanada" Belt)

The Belts run (every second year) by SAI/SI-SAI are:
 1988 - Wales (The Welsh event was a joint CBSI/SAI event)
 1990 - Northumberland
 1992 - Scotland
 1994 - no event run
 1996 - Wales
 1998 - Spain
 2000 - France
 2002 - Spain

Events run by Scouting Ireland are:
 2004 - Germany
 2005 - United States
 2006 - Portugal
 2007 - Poland
 2008 - Croatia and Slovenia
 2009 - Sweden and Denmark
 2010 - Benelux Region
 2011 - Austria and Czech Republic
 2012 - Brittany, France
 2013 - Basque Region, Spain
 2014 - Slovakia and Hungary
 2015 - Germany
 2016 - Italy
 2017 - Poland
 2018 - Netherlands
 2019 - Scandinavia (specifically Denmark and Sweden)
 2020 - event cancelled due to the COVID-19 pandemic
 2021 - Ireland (first Explorer Belt hosted in Ireland, due to travel restrictions imposed by the COVID-19 pandemic) 
 2022 - Portugal

Format
Rover Scouts, in teams of two, must travel a distance of at least 200 km on foot, and 100 km in public transport, over 10 days, completing various tasks along the way. These tasks include maintaining a log of the journey, consisting of a daily route, menu, budget and account of the day's activities.  Each team must also complete a number of prescribed challenges, which encourage the participants to engage with the local populace and to learn about the local culture. In the past, participants also had to complete two self-chosen challenges in form of special interest badges, but this was phased out with the addition of the public transport requirement in 2019. Each team must find its own way back to a base camp where the expedition leaders are waiting for them. Teams are dropped off in an unknown location with just a map, the location of base camp and a small amount of money on which to survive - typically €3 per person, per day of the event.

Aims
The aim of the event is to test skills of communication, physical endurance and teamwork. Complete immersion in a foreign culture necessitates an ability to adapt to the norms of a different society with different customs and values, usually also a different language.

The Award
Not all participants are successfully awarded the Belt. When they reach base-camp participants spend a few days relaxing and recovering while the expedition leaders examine the log books the teams maintained while they were travelling. If a team has, to the satisfaction of the leaders, succeeded in achieving their aims and fulfilling their own potential they are awarded the belt at a presentation ceremony.

Since at least 2010 there are 3 tiers of award:
 Certificate - Given to all who set out on the expedition
 Certificate and Badge - Given to all participants who cover the minimum distance for the event
 Certificate, Badge and Explorer Belt - Given to all participants who meet all criteria as marked out by the assessors prior to the expedition.

References

Scouting Ireland
Scout and Guide awards